On a Lorentzian manifold, certain curves are distinguished as timelike. A timelike homotopy between two timelike curves is a homotopy such that each intermediate curve is timelike. No closed timelike curve (CTC) on a Lorentzian manifold is timelike homotopic to a point (that is, null timelike homotopic); such a manifold is therefore said to be multiply connected by timelike curves (or timelike multiply connected). A manifold such as the 3-sphere can be simply connected (by any type of curve), and at the same time be timelike multiply connected. Equivalence classes of timelike homotopic curves define their own fundamental group, as noted by Smith (1967). A smooth topological feature which prevents a CTC from being deformed to a point may be called a timelike topological feature.

References

Algebraic topology
Homotopy theory
Lorentzian manifolds